Adenanthos meisneri, commonly known as prostrate woollybush, is a species of shrub in the family Proteaceae. It is endemic to the south-west of Western Australia.

Description
It usually grows to 1 metre high and has leaves are up to 80 mm in length and about 7 mm wide. The flowers  appear predominantly  between September and December in the species' native range. These have a red-purple to pale violet perianth  (up to 30 mm long) and glandular hairs. The style is up to 40 mm long.

Etymology
The species was first formally described in 1845 by botanist Johann Lehmann in Plantae Preissianae The type specimen was collected from the foot of the Darling Scarp by Ludwig Preiss in 1839.

It is susceptible to Phytophthora cinnamomi dieback.

References

External links
 
 
 

meisneri
Endemic flora of Southwest Australia
Eudicots of Western Australia
Taxa named by Carl Meissner